The Perkins 4.182 was a diesel engine built by Mazda (Toyo Kogyo) under licence from Perkins Engines, and was fitted to numerous Mazda light vehicles; primarily vans, utilities (pickups) and light trucks.  It was known as the HA series Mazda Diesel, and was termed the 3000 model in vehicles (3.0L). It was also licensed to Westerbeke designated as W70.

Versions
"Early" version, 1977 to 9/1980
The "Early" HA engine uses 31.75mm gudgeon (wrist) pins, has indirect fuel injection, and uses pressed sheet metal ("tin") rocker (valve) covers.

"Late" version, 10/1980 onwards
The "Late" HA engine uses 30mm diameter gudgeon (wrist) pins, uses direct fuel injection, and has aluminium alloy rocker (valve) covers.

See also
 List of Perkins engines

Perkins engines

Diesel engines by model